Nicole Kubik (born March 1, 1978) is a former professional basketball player. She was the 15th pick in the 2000 WNBA Draft.

High school
Kubik was the third-leading scorer in Cambridge High School history. She helped lead the school to an 81-game winning streak.

Nebraska  statistics 
Source

WNBA stats

References

External links
ESPN.com – COMMUNITY – Defense best offense for Kubik

1978 births
Living people
American women's basketball players
Guards (basketball)
Los Angeles Sparks draft picks
Nebraska Cornhuskers women's basketball players
Phoenix Mercury players